Najas tenuifolia is an aquatic plant growing in fresh water ponds. It is a native to Hong Kong, Thailand, Indonesia (Java, Maluku, Sulawesi, Bali, Lombok, Timor), the Philippines and Australia (every state and territory except Tasmania).

Varieties and Subspecies
Four varietal are currently recognized:

Najas tenuifolia var. celebica (Koord.) W.J.de Wilde - Sulawesi
Najas tenuifolia var. pseudograminea (W.Koch) W.J.de Wilde - most of specific range
Najas tenuifolia var. tenuifolia  - Sulawesi, Australia

References

tenuifolia
Aquatic plants
Flora of Thailand
Flora of Hong Kong
Flora of Malesia
Flora of Australia
Flora of China
Plants described in 1810